Rohrbach is a river of Baden-Württemberg and of Bavaria, Germany. It is a left tributary of the Tauber.

See also
List of rivers of Baden-Württemberg
List of rivers of Bavaria

References

Rivers of Baden-Württemberg
Rivers of Bavaria
Rivers of Germany